Urbano José Allgayer (March 16, 1924 – May 14, 2019) was a Brazilian prelate of the Catholic Church.

Biography
Allgayer was born in Santa Clara, Brazil and was ordained a priest on December 10, 1950. Allgayer was appointed auxiliary bishop of the Archdiocese of Porto Alegre, as well as Titular Bishop of Tunnuna, on February 5, 1974 and was consecrated on March 24, 1974. Allgayer was appointed bishop of the Archdiocese of Passo Fundo on February 4, 1982. Allgayer retired from the diocese on May 19, 1999. He died on May 14, 2019.

References

External links
Catholic-Hierarchy 
Archdiocese of Passo Fundo 

1924 births
2019 deaths
20th-century Roman Catholic bishops in Brazil
Roman Catholic titular bishops of Tunnuna
Roman Catholic bishops of Passo Fundo